Yaniv Chichian (born 15 August 1979) is a former Israeli footballer currently playing his trade at Hapoel Kfar Saba.

Honours
Liga Leumit (1):
2001-02
Toto Cup (Leumit) (1):
2004-05

References

External links
 

1979 births
Israeli Jews
Living people
Hapoel Kfar Saba F.C. players
Bnei Yehuda Tel Aviv F.C. players
F.C. Ashdod players
Maccabi Netanya F.C. players
Hapoel Be'er Sheva F.C. players
Hapoel Nof HaGalil F.C. players
Hapoel Haifa F.C. players
Hapoel Acre F.C. players
Hapoel Nir Ramat HaSharon F.C. players
Israeli footballers
Association football defenders
Liga Leumit players
Israeli Premier League players